Eagle's Store is a family business in West Yellowstone, Montana, whose three-story log building is listed on the National Register of Historic Places. The original store was established in 1908 on the same site and was razed in 1927 to make room for the present building, constructed in Rustic architectural style. Two blocks from the west entrance to Yellowstone National Park, Eagle's Store is the oldest operating business in West Yellowstone, and is still run by the same family who founded it.

History 
Eyeing the growing popularity of tourism to Yellowstone National Park, the Union Pacific Railroad constructed its Oregon Short Line segment to the West Gate of Yellowstone Park between 1905 and 1907. In 1907 Samuel Peter Eagle, a Yellowstone Park employee, requested a permit from the United States Forest Service to lease commercial space next to the railroad's right of way. In June 1908 the Forest Service surveyed a six-block townsite on the western boundary of Yellowstone Park and issued business permits on one-acre (0.4 ha) plots. The first three business operators were Eagle and his partner, Alex Stuart, who built a general store; L. A. Murray, who opened the Yellowstone Hotel in 1909; and Charles Arnet, who opened the Yellowstone Store. While these and other ventures primarily serviced railway passengers in the early 20th century, the introduction of the automobile in 1916 brought many more visitors to Yellowstone Park and business flourished, turning West Yellowstone into a permanent town.

In 1908 Stuart left the partnership to open his own business; he bought the lease to Arnet's store in 1910. Eagle's Store continued to be operated by Eagle and his descendants.

When it first opened, Eagle's Store stocked "candies, tobaccos, Kodaks, postals, cigars, fishing rods and rented dusters". A white marble soda fountain manufactured by the Liquid Carbonic Company of Minnesota was added in 1910 at a cost of $1391.80.,  The local post office was located in Eagle's Store from 1909 to 1935, with Sam Eagle as the postmaster. Following the construction of its new building in 1930, the store began to offer a wider selection of merchandise and services. As of 2012, it sells sportswear, western wear, hiking and backpacking gear, fishing tackle, Native American arts and crafts, and souvenirs. The newer building retained the mahogany bar and soda fountain installed in 1910 and added a front bar and stools.

Design 
Eagle enlarged the store in 1913 and then had it razed in 1927 to build the three-story structure that stands today.

The current structure, begun in 1927 and completed in 1930, was designed by Bozeman architect Fred F. Willson, who also designed the Coca-Cola bottling plant that is part of the Bozeman Brewery Historic District. Willson donated his services to the project in order to promote the Western Rustic architectural style. The design was similar to that of Old Faithful Inn in Yellowstone Park, which utilizes National Park Service rustic style, of which exposed logs are a key element. Buttresses were made of basalt.

Family business 

All 10 of the children of Sam Eagle (1881–1950) and his wife, Ida Christine Carlson (1883–1962), worked in the store as children, as have many other descendants and relatives. Now in its fourth generation of ownership. Many family members are avid skiers, including Heather McPhie, a great-granddaughter of Sam and Ida, who competed in the 2010 Winter Olympics in Vancouver. The family has set up its own charitable foundation, which benefits people with disabilities, education, and youth programs.

See also 
 National Register of Historic Places listings in Gallatin County, Montana

References

Sources

External links 

 
 West Yellowstone News obituary of Bettie Eagle Nelson
 West Yellowstone News obituary of Luther R. Nelson

Commercial buildings on the National Register of Historic Places in Montana
Commercial buildings completed in 1927
1908 establishments in Montana
National Register of Historic Places in Gallatin County, Montana
Rustic architecture in Montana
Log buildings and structures on the National Register of Historic Places in Montana
West Yellowstone, Montana